Panzani is a French brand of pasta. Since 2005, it has been a subsidiary of Ebro Foods.

Overview
The brand was started by Jean Panzani in Parthenay in 1950. In the 1950s, he sold pasta in cellophane whereas other companies used cardboard. From 1960 to 1964, it merged with La Lune and Régia Scaramelli. It was in the 1960s that it became the market leader in pasta wholesalers in France. In 1964, Roland Barthes analysed a commercial by Panzani in his essay entitled 'The Rhetoric of the Image', suggesting Panzani was trying to come across as Italian.

In 1973, it was bought by Groupe Danone. Its TV commercials featured André Aubert as Don Patillo, a namesake for Don Camillo, made famous by Fernandel.

In 1997, it was bought by Paribas Affaires Industrielles. In 2002, it bought Lustucru, another French brand of pasta.

In April 2005, it was bought by Ebro Foods.

References

Pasta companies
French brands
Food and drink companies established in 1946
Companies based in Lyon
BNP Paribas
1946 establishments in France
1973 mergers and acquisitions
1997 mergers and acquisitions
2002 mergers and acquisitions
2005 mergers and acquisitions